KTVL (channel 10) is a television station in Medford, Oregon, United States, affiliated with CBS and The CW Plus.

History
Channel 10 signed on the air on October 3, 1961, as KMED-TV, owned by Ray Johnson and his company, Radio Medford, Inc., along with KMED radio (1440 AM). Several groups contended for the second television station in the area, but Radio Medford received a substantial assist from Bill Smulin, owner of KTVM (channel 5, now KOBI), who offered Radio Medford space on KTVM's tower. KMED-TV was an NBC affiliate, since KMED had been an NBC radio affiliate since 1937. It also shared ABC with KTVM.

In 1963, the station started a joint news department with its radio sister. KMED radio had set up the first full radio news department between Portland and San Francisco in 1957.

In 1966, the station moved to a new tower on Mount Ashland, which added Klamath Falls to its city-grade coverage. It is the highest transmitting tower in the Pacific Northwest. To this day, channel 10 is the only Medford station that covers the entire market without a full-power satellite station.

KMED-TV bought the first color cameras in Southern Oregon in 1968, a year of many firsts for the station. That year also saw the area's first live remote broadcast, the first television editorials and the first use of live microwave technology.

In 1977, KMED was sold off, and KMED-TV became KTVL. A year later, the station picked up some CBS programs after KOBI switched its primary affiliation to ABC. In 1981, Johnson sold KTVL to Freedom Communications, marking Freedom's entry into television. Under Freedom's ownership, KTVL aired the first color weather forecast in Southern Oregon. In the meantime Johnson was working on another station, which would become KTVZ in Bend, Oregon.

In 1983, KTVL became a CBS affiliate, and KOBI switched to NBC. ABC programming would not return to the market until KDRV (channel 12) signed on a year later. Kingsley Kelley currently serves as the station's general manager.

Freedom announced on November 2, 2011, that it would bow out of television and sell its stations, including KTVL, to Sinclair Broadcast Group. On April 2, 2012, Sinclair took over official ownership of the station as shown at their website.

Southern Oregon CW 11
On September 18, 2006, The WB and UPN merged to form the new CW Television Network. KTVL has picked up the affiliation to The CW, and is broadcasting its programming on a digital subchannel. KMFD, Medford's former WB "cable-only" station is the new CW affiliate and has been renamed "Southern Oregon's CW 11". KTVL-DT2 is part of The CW Plus.

Local programming

News 10 Good Morning
On January 24, 2011, KTVL added an additional hour to their morning news program. Originally, it was News 10 at 6 a.m. but they changed the start time to 4:55 a.m. dubbing it News 10 Good Morning going head-to-head with competitor KDRV's early morning newscast. The show switched up its format, differing from its competitors to include faster-paced headline style news with more morning weather hits than any other station in Southern Oregon and Northern California. In addition to showcasing the station's strong social media content, with the only station to have smart phone and iPad applications.

Jerry Lewis MDA Telethon (1970–2010) / MDA Labor Day Telethon (2011)
KTVL was also the only southern Oregon and northern California television station that has continuously broadcast the Jerry Lewis MDA Telethon, benefiting the Muscular Dystrophy Association every Labor Day weekend from 1970 to 2011. (Fellow CBS affiliate KHSL-TV in Chico, California, was the next closest station to do so before broadcasting the program was ceased after 1997 by new ownership.) The local portion of the telethon was hosted by Marvin Rhodes, who was the main host for 35 years, and Donna Hildebrand, who was co-host for over 25 years, until they ended their tenure as main telethon hosts in 2005. Members of the News 10 team including Trish (Borucki) Glose, Kevin Lollis and Libby Dowsett had hosted the telethon at various times until the format was dissolved by MDA in 2012. It is believed to have been one of the most successful local telethon broadcasts in the country.

The most emotional moment came in 2002 when a devastated Rhodes announced that Grants Pass, Oregon resident Ray Dimmick, who battled courageously against ALS (Lou Gehrig's Disease), had died in December 2001. Dimmick, accompanied by his wife Debra, appeared on the show every year for 10 years despite his condition deteriorating. A tribute video was broadcast in his memory.

With Jerry Lewis' retirement as host of the national telethon and its move from 21½ hours to six hours in 2011, KTVL did air the telethon as usual. On February 10, 2012, MDA announced that the 2012 edition would be cut to three hours in length airing during prime time on Sunday, September 2, 2012. The 2012 edition, renamed the MDA Show of Strength (moving away from its heritage as a telethon), effectively ended KTVL's 41 years of telethon coverage. The special was since picked up by ABC for two years in 2013 and 2014, before being canceled altogether by MDA in early 2015.

After 10
On June 3, 2006, KTVL launched a new locally produced late night program for young adults called After 10, hosted by Curtis Bartlett and Lindsey Matherly, every Saturday night at 11:30 p.m. It was dubbed as the only locally produced show that delivers news and information on the local music scene, video games, movie releases (in theaters and on video), graphic novels, music videos, viral videos from the internet, and websites.

After 10 was KTVL's attempt to compete against NBC's Saturday Night Live by producing a program for its target audience themselves, instead on relying on syndication. After 10 was being retooled and was expected to be relaunched in the third quarter of 2007, but it never returned to the air.

After various syndicated programs and infomercials aired in the 11:30 p.m. slot, the slot became the home of the weekly Ring of Honor Wrestling show in April 2012 upon the acquisition of the station by Sinclair, which owned the RoH circuit until 2022.

News operation

KTVL broadcasts 22 hours of locally production news each week. It was known as NewsCenter 10 in the late 1970s back when they were an NBC affiliate. The name NewsCenter was used by many NBC-owned and/or affiliated stations to identify their newscasts. After KTVL switched to CBS, the name of the newscast was changed to Channel 10 News.

The news department featured well-known news personalities such as Terry Miller, Hank Henry, George Warren, Leon Hunsaker (also previously of KOBI and theDove), Marvin Rhodes, Pete Belcastro, Fred Inglis (formerly of KTVU) and, most notably, Ann Curry (who went on to become host of NBC's Today Show in 2011). The current news director is Chad Hypes.

The newscasts are currently anchored by Carmine Gemei at 5:00 p.m., 6:00 p.m. and 11:00 p.m. The chief meteorologist is former KDRV meteorologist Milt Radford. Tyler Myerly anchor the 5 a.m. newscast News 10 Good Morning with the weather by meteorologist Ali Van Fleet. Myerly anchors the region's only noon newscast.

KTVL does not currently have a full-time local sportscast as it was dropped in 2009 by management. However, in 2012, hints of a possible return took place as the news team began covering local high school basketball highlights called Friday Night Fastbreaks (KDRV is the only station in the market to continue airing a local sportscast and KOBI does not have a sports department.)

Notable former news staff
Ann Curry (reporter/Telethon co-hostess, now with NBC News and formerly of NBC's Today)
Leon Hunsaker (meteorologist, died in 2022)

Technical information

Subchannels
The station's digital signal is multiplexed:

Analog-to-digital conversion
KTVL shut down its analog signal, over VHF channel 10, on June 12, 2009, the official date in which full-power television stations in the United States transitioned from analog to digital broadcasts under federal mandate. The station's digital signal relocated from its pre-transition UHF channel 35 to VHF channel 10 for post-transition operations.

Translators

See also
Channel 10 digital TV stations in the United States
Channel 10 virtual TV stations in the United States
Channel 11 branded TV stations in the United States

References

External links 
 KTVL News 10 website
 SouthernOregonCW.com
 History of Television In Southern Oregon

CBS network affiliates
The CW affiliates
Comet (TV network) affiliates
TBD (TV network) affiliates
Charge! (TV network) affiliates
Sinclair Broadcast Group
Television channels and stations established in 1961
TVL
1961 establishments in Oregon